Giriyak is a village and community development block located on the bank of the Panchane River in Nalanda district of Bihar, India.

Giriyak stupa — a Gupta-era Buddhist stupa — is located on the western side of the Panchane River, opposite the village of Giriyak.

Demographics
At the time of the 2011 Census of India, the population Giriyak was 96,845, of which 50,124 are male and 46,721 are female.

Transportation
NH 20 passes through the town connecting it with Pawapuri and Bihar Sharif. State Highway SH 71 connects it with Rajgir and Barbigha.

References

Cities and towns in Nalanda district